Bothwellhaugh was a Scottish coal mining village housing Hamilton Palace Colliery workers and their families. Locals referred to the village as The Pailis. It was located near to the towns of Motherwell, Bellshill and Hamilton in Lanarkshire, being occupied from the mid-1880s until it was demolished in 1965.

Pre-mining History
The remains of the Bothwellhaugh Roman Fort and a Roman bath house were found in the park; it is around a day's march from the Antonine Wall.
James Hamilton of Bothwellhaugh, became notorious for being the assassin of James Stewart, 1st Earl of Moray, Regent of Scotland, at Linlithgow in 1570.

Mining Village
There were two coal mines on the site operated by the Bent Colliery Company. Housing was developed from the late 1880s until 1905. Before WW1 over 2000 tonnes of coal a day were being produced by over 1000 miners. The mining from this pit led to the demolition of Hamilton Palace due to subsidence.

Decline and flooding
The pit shut in May 1959 as flooding in the pits which went under the River Clyde meant that pumping became a major cost. The houses had fallen into poor state of repair and sewage was becoming a problem.

The site of the village has now been flooded to produce Strathclyde Loch, within Strathclyde Country Park. about ten miles south-east of Glasgow.

The Bothwellhaugh name is retained in a set of football/rugby pitches operated by North Lanarkshire Council, near to the M&D's amusement park and the Raith Interchange of the M74 motorway / A725.

Memorial
There is a cairn at Strathclyde Park to remember the village. Former residents of the village hold an annual reunion, meeting at the cairn. A memorial to the village and visitor centre has been proposed at the old Raith farm workers cottage.

Bibliography
Bothwellhaugh: A Lanarkshire mining community, 1884-1965 Robert Duncan,   Workers Educational Association, 1986

References

External links
Lost Village of Bothwellhaugh  video (10 mins)
Bothwellhaugh Ex-Residents Committee

Former populated places in Scotland
Ghost towns in Scotland
1880s establishments in Scotland
1965 disestablishments in Scotland
Populated places established in the 1880s
Populated places disestablished in 1965
History of North Lanarkshire
Mining communities in Scotland
Former mines in Scotland